China Grove is a historic building in Lorman, Jefferson County, Mississippi.

Overview
It was designed by architects Wiley McDonald and Willis McDonald. The architectural style is Greek Revival.

It has been listed on the National Register of Historic Places since April 3, 1980.

References

Houses on the National Register of Historic Places in Mississippi
Houses in Jefferson County, Mississippi
Greek Revival houses in Mississippi
National Register of Historic Places in Jefferson County, Mississippi